The 1992 European Cup final was a football match held on 20 May 1992 at Wembley Stadium, London, between Sampdoria of Italy and Barcelona of Spain. Barcelona won the game 1–0 after extra time, thanks to a Ronald Koeman free kick, to record their first triumph in the competition. It was the first to have a group stage involving the eight second-round winners split into two groups, and the winner of each one met in the final. In doing so, they became the second Spanish club to win the tournament and the 19th overall. This was the last final before the competition was re-branded as the Champions League. The final is, as of 2022, the most recent in which both of the finalists entered a European Cup/UEFA Champions League final having not won any of the previous finals.

Teams

Route to the final

Match

Details

See also
1989 European Cup Winners' Cup Final – contested by the same teams
1991–92 European Cup
FC Barcelona in international football competitions
U.C. Sampdoria in European football

External links
1991–92 season at UEFA website

1992
Final
1
European Cup Final 1992
European Cup Final 1992
European Cup Final
European Cup Final 1992
European
European
May 1992 sports events in Europe
Events at Wembley Stadium